85 may refer to: 

 85 (number)
 one of the years 85 BC, AD 85, 1885, 1985, 2085

See also

 
 M85 (disambiguation), including "Model 85"
 1985 (disambiguation)
 List of highways numbered